Selce Keč is a village in the municipality of Bogovinje, North Macedonia.

Demographics
As of the 2021 census, Selce Keč had 86 residents with the following ethnic composition:
Albanians 62
Persons for whom data are taken from administrative sources 24

According to the 2002 census, the village had a total of 212 inhabitants. Ethnic groups in the village include:

Albanians 211
Others 1

References

External links

Villages in Bogovinje Municipality
Albanian communities in North Macedonia